Saumont-la-Poterie is a commune in the Seine-Maritime department in the Normandy region in northern France.

Geography

Population

Places of interest
 An ancient bridge.
 The church of St. Denis, dating from the sixteenth century.

See also
Communes of the Seine-Maritime department

References

Communes of Seine-Maritime